Richard Ivan Pervo (May 11, 1942 – May 19, 2017) was an American biblical scholar, former Episcopal priest, and Fellow of the Westar Institute. He was best known for his works on the New Testament book of Acts of the Apostles. In 2001, Pervo was convicted for possession of child sexual abuse material.

Biography
Pervo was born in Lakewood, Ohio, the son of Ivan Pervo and Elizabeth Kline. He married Karen E. Moreland on April 2, 1967.

Pervo received his undergraduate degree from Concordia Senior College in Fort Wayne, Indiana in 1964. He received a Bachelor of Divinity at the Episcopal Divinity School of Cambridge, Massachusetts, and earned his Th.D. from Harvard University in 1979. A revised version of his dissertation was published in 1987 as Profit with Delight: The Literary Genre of the Acts of the Apostles.

Pervo died of leukemia in St. Paul, Minnesota on May 19, 2017.

Career 
Pervo taught at Seabury-Western Theological Seminary (1975–1999) and as professor of Classical and Near Eastern Studies at the University of Minnesota (1999–2001). He served as an Episcopalian priest until 2003.

A Festschrift in recognition of his scholarship was published posthumously by Mohr Siebeck in late 2017.

Criminal conviction
In February 2001, Pervo was arrested after investigators found thousands of images of child pornography on his work computer at the University of Minnesota. In May he pleaded guilty  to five counts of possession and one count of distribution of child pornography. He was sentenced to one year in a state workhouse and eight years probation. He formally resigned from the University of Minnesota as of June 2001, having been suspended since his arrest. After serving his sentence he continued to publish theological works as an independent scholar and Fellow of the Westar Institute, and was recognized as an authority on the canonical and non-canonical books of Acts.

Selected works
 Profit with Delight: The Literary Genre of the Acts of the Apostles  (1987) 
 Luke's Story of Paul (1990) 
 Rethinking the Unity of Luke and Acts (with Mikael C. Parsons) (1993) 
 "Romancing an Oft-Neglected Stone: The Pastoral Epistles and The Epistolary Novel" (1994) Journal of the Higher Criticism, 1 (Fall 1994), 25-47.
 Dating Acts: Between the Evangelists and the Apologists (2006) 
 Acts: A Commentary (2008) 
 The Mystery of Acts: Unravelling its Story (2008) 
 The Making of Paul: Constructions of the Apostle in Early Christianity (2010) 
 The Acts of Paul: A New Translation with Introduction and Commentary (2014) 
 The Gospel of Luke (2014) 
 The Acts of John (2015) 
 The Pastorals and Polycarp (2016)

Notes

References

External links 
 Profile at Westar Institute

1942 births
2017 deaths
Deaths from leukemia
New Testament scholars
American biblical scholars
American people convicted of child pornography offenses
Harvard Divinity School alumni
Episcopal Divinity School alumni
American members of the clergy convicted of crimes
Members of the Jesus Seminar